Port Phillip is in Victoria, Australia. It has many beaches, most of which are flat, shallow and long, with very small breaks making swimming quite safe. This attracts many tourists, mostly families, to the beaches of Port Phillip during the summer months and school holidays. Water sports such as body boarding and swimming are common, though waves are very rarely large enough for surfing. A number of lifesaving clubs operate along Port Phillip’s beaches.

Most sandy beaches are located on the northern, eastern and southern shorelines, while the western shorelines host a few sandy beaches, there mostly exists a greater variety of beaches, swampy wetlands and mangroves. The occasional pebble beach and easy sand dunes can also be found, mostly in the southern reaches.

Beaches

Hobsons Bay
 Yarra River
 Sandridge Beach - Port Melbourne
 Port Melbourne Beach - Port Melbourne
 South Melbourne Beach - Albert Park
 West Beach - St Kilda West
 St Kilda Beach - St Kilda

Between Hobsons and Beaumaris Bays

 Elwood Beach - Elwood
 Seacombe Grove Beach - Brighton
 Middle Brighton Beach - Brighton
 Dendy Street Beach - Brighton
 Brighton Beach - Brighton
 Hampton Beach - Hampton
 Sandringham Beach - Sandringham
 Half Moon Bay Beach - Black Rock
 Black Rock Beach - Black Rock
 Ricketts Point Beach - Beaumaris
Watkins Bay Beach
Keefers Cove Beach

Beaumaris Bay

 Mentone Beach - Mentone
 Parkdale Beach - Parkdale
 Mordialloc Beach - Mordialloc
 Aspendale Beach - Aspendale
 Edithvale Beach - Edithvale
 Chelsea Beach - Chelsea
 Bonbeach Beach - Bonbeach
 Carrum Beach - Carrum
 Seaford Beach - Seaford
Long Island Beach
 Frankston Beach - Frankston
 South Frankston Beach - Frankston/Frankston South

Between Beaumaris and Dromana Bays
 Daveys Bay Beach - Mount Eliza
 Mount Eliza Beach - Mount Eliza
Canadian Bay Beach
 Half Moon Bay Beach - Mount Eliza
 Ranelagh Beach - Mount Eliza
 Moondah Beach - Mount Eliza
 Sunnyside North Beach - Mount Eliza
 Sunnyside Beach - Mount Eliza
 Mills Beach - Mornington
Mills Beach East
 Shire Hall Beach - Mornington
 Mothers Beach - Mornington
 Royal Beach - Mornington
 Fishermans Beach - Mornington
 Fosters Beach - Mornington
Fosters Slip
 Fossil Beach - Mornington
 Dava Beach - Mount Martha
 Birdrock Beach - Mount Martha
 Craigie Beach - Mount Martha
 Hawker Beach - Mount Martha
 Mount Martha Beach North - Mount Martha
 Mount Martha Beach South - Mount Martha

Dromana Bay
 Pebble Cove Beach - Mount Martha
 Safety Beach - Safety Beach
 Dromana Beach - Dromana
Anthonys Nose Beach - Dromana

Capel Sound
 McCrae Beach - McCrae
 Rosebud Beach - Rosebud
 Rosebud West Beach - Rosebud West
 Tootgarook Beach - Tootgarook
 Rye Beach - Rye
Rye Beach East
Rye Beach West
 Tyrone Beach - Rye
 Blairgowrie Beach - Blairgowrie
 Camerons Bight Beach - Sorrento
 Sullivan Bay Beach - Sorrento
 Sorrento Front Beach - Sorrento
 Policemans Point Beach - Sorrento

Corio Bay
 Point Henry Beaches - Moolap
 Eastern Beach - Geelong
 Western Beach - Geelong
 Rippleside Beach - Rippleside
 St Helens Beach - North Geelong
 Limeburners Bay Beach - Corio
 Avalon Beach - Avalon

Between Corio and Altona Bays
Much of this coastline is undeveloped and is occupied by either military facilities or the Western Treatment Plant.
 Werribee South Beach - Werribee South
 East Beach - Werribee South
 Wyndham Harbour South Beach - Werribee South
 Wyndham Harbour North Beach - Werribee South
 Campbells Cove Beaches - Werribee South

Altona Bay
 Altona Beach - Altona
 Seaholme Beach - Seaholme
 Williamstown Beach - Williamstown
 Shelley Beach - Williamstown
 Yarra River

Beaches of Victoria (Australia)
Port Phillip
Lists of beaches in Australia
Lists of tourist attractions in Victoria (Australia)